Augusta Ada King, Countess of Lovelace (née Byron; 10 December 1815 – 27 November 1852) was an English mathematician and writer, chiefly known for her work on Charles Babbage's proposed mechanical general-purpose computer, the Analytical Engine. She was the first to recognise that the machine had applications beyond pure calculation, and to have published the first algorithm intended to be carried out by such a machine. As a result, she is often regarded as the first computer programmer.

Ada Byron was the only legitimate child of poet Lord Byron and Lady Byron. All of Byron's other children were born out of wedlock to other women. Byron separated from his wife a month after Ada was born and left England forever. Four months later, he commemorated the parting in a poem that begins, "Is thy face like thy mother's my fair child! ADA! sole daughter of my house and heart?" He died in Greece when Ada was eight. Her mother remained bitter and promoted Ada's interest in mathematics and logic in an effort to prevent her from developing her father's perceived insanity. Despite this, Ada remained interested in him, naming her two sons Byron and Gordon. Upon her death, she was buried next to him at her request. Although often ill in her childhood, Ada pursued her studies assiduously. She married William King in 1835. King was made Earl of Lovelace in 1838, Ada thereby becoming Countess of Lovelace.

Her educational and social exploits brought her into contact with scientists such as Andrew Crosse, Charles Babbage, Sir David Brewster, Charles Wheatstone, Michael Faraday, and the author Charles Dickens, contacts which she used to further her education. Ada described her approach as "poetical science" and herself as an "Analyst (& Metaphysician)".

When she was eighteen, her mathematical talents led her to a long working relationship and friendship with fellow British mathematician Charles Babbage, who is known as "the father of computers". She was in particular interested in Babbage's work on the Analytical Engine. Lovelace first met him in June 1833, through their mutual friend, and her private tutor, Mary Somerville.

Between 1842 and 1843, Ada translated an article by Italian military engineer Luigi Menabrea about the Analytical Engine, supplementing it with an elaborate set of notes, simply called "Notes". Lovelace's notes are important in the early history of computers, containing what many consider to be the first computer program—that is, an algorithm designed to be carried out by a machine. Other historians reject this perspective and point out that Babbage's personal notes from the years 1836/1837 contain the first programs for the engine. She also developed a vision of the capability of computers to go beyond mere calculating or number-crunching, while many others, including Babbage himself, focused only on those capabilities. Her mindset of "poetical science" led her to ask questions about the Analytical Engine (as shown in her notes) examining how individuals and society relate to technology as a collaborative tool.

Biography

Childhood
Lord Byron expected his child to be a "glorious boy" and was disappointed when Lady Byron gave birth to a girl. The child was named after Byron's half-sister, Augusta Leigh, and was called "Ada" by Byron himself. On 16 January 1816, at Lord Byron's command, Lady Byron left for her parents' home at Kirkby Mallory, taking their five-week-old daughter with her. Although English law at the time granted full custody of children to the father in cases of separation, Lord Byron made no attempt to claim his parental rights, but did request that his sister keep him informed of Ada's welfare.

On 21 April, Lord Byron signed the deed of separation, although very reluctantly, and left England for good a few days later. Aside from an acrimonious separation, Lady Byron continued throughout her life to make allegations about her husband's immoral behaviour. This set of events made Lovelace infamous in Victorian society. Ada did not have a relationship with her father. He died in 1824 when she was eight years old. Her mother was the only significant parental figure in her life. Lovelace was not shown the family portrait of her father until her 20th birthday.

Lovelace did not have a close relationship with her mother. She was often left in the care of her maternal grandmother Judith, Hon. Lady Milbanke, who doted on her. However, because of societal attitudes of the time—which favoured the husband in any separation, with the welfare of any child acting as mitigation—Lady Byron had to present herself as a loving mother to the rest of society. This included writing anxious letters to Lady Milbanke about her daughter's welfare, with a cover note saying to retain the letters in case she had to use them to show maternal concern. In one letter to Lady Milbanke, she referred to her daughter as "it": "I talk to it for your satisfaction, not my own, and shall be very glad when you have it under your own." Lady Byron had her teenage daughter watched by close friends for any sign of moral deviation. Lovelace dubbed these observers the "Furies" and later complained they exaggerated and invented stories about her.

Lovelace was often ill, beginning in early childhood. At the age of eight, she experienced headaches that obscured her vision. In June 1829, she was paralyzed after a bout of measles. She was subjected to continuous bed rest for nearly a year, something which may have extended her period of disability. By 1831, she was able to walk with crutches. Despite the illnesses, she developed her mathematical and technological skills.

Ada Byron had an affair with a tutor in early 1833. She tried to elope with him after she was caught, but the tutor's relatives recognised her and contacted her mother. Lady Byron and her friends covered the incident up to prevent a public scandal. Lovelace never met her younger half-sister, Allegra, the daughter of Lord Byron and Claire Clairmont. Allegra died in 1822 at the age of five. Lovelace did have some contact with Elizabeth Medora Leigh, the daughter of Byron's half-sister Augusta Leigh, who purposely avoided Lovelace as much as possible when introduced at court.

Adult years

Lovelace became close friends with her tutor Mary Somerville, who introduced her to Charles Babbage in 1833. She had a strong respect and affection for Somerville, and they corresponded for many years. Other acquaintances included the scientists Andrew Crosse, Sir David Brewster, Charles Wheatstone, Michael Faraday and the author Charles Dickens. She was presented at Court at the age of seventeen "and became a popular belle of the season" in part because of her "brilliant mind". By 1834 Ada was a regular at Court and started attending various events. She danced often and was able to charm many people, and was described by most people as being dainty, although John Hobhouse, Byron's friend, described her as "a large, coarse-skinned young woman but with something of my friend's features, particularly the mouth". This description followed their meeting on 24 February 1834 in which Ada made it clear to Hobhouse that she did not like him, probably due to her mother's influence, which led her to dislike all of her father's friends. This first impression was not to last, and they later became friends.

On 8 July 1835, she married William, 8th Baron King, becoming Lady King. They had three homes: Ockham Park, Surrey; a Scottish estate on Loch Torridon in Ross-shire; and a house in London. They spent their honeymoon at Worthy Manor in Ashley Combe near Porlock Weir, Somerset. The Manor had been built as a hunting lodge in 1799 and was improved by King in preparation for their honeymoon. It later became their summer retreat and was further improved during this time. From 1845, the family's main house was Horsley Towers, built in the Tudorbethan fashion by the architect of the Houses of Parliament, Charles Barry, and later greatly enlarged to Lovelace's own designs.

They had three children: Byron (born 1836); Anne Isabella (called Annabella, born 1837); and Ralph Gordon (born 1839). Immediately after the birth of Annabella, Lady King experienced "a tedious and suffering illness, which took months to cure". Ada was a descendant of the extinct Barons Lovelace and in 1838, her husband was made Earl of Lovelace and Viscount Ockham, meaning Ada became the Countess of Lovelace. In 1843–44, Ada's mother assigned William Benjamin Carpenter to teach Ada's children and to act as a "moral" instructor for Ada. He quickly fell for her and encouraged her to express any frustrated affections, claiming that his marriage meant he would never act in an "unbecoming" manner. When it became clear that Carpenter was trying to start an affair, Ada cut it off.

In 1841, Lovelace and Medora Leigh (the daughter of Lord Byron's half-sister Augusta Leigh) were told by Ada's mother that Ada's father was also Medora's father. On 27 February 1841, Ada wrote to her mother: "I am not in the least astonished. In fact, you merely confirm what I have for years and years felt scarcely a doubt about, but should have considered it most improper in me to hint to you that I in any way suspected." She did not blame the incestuous relationship on Byron, but instead blamed Augusta Leigh: "I fear she is more inherently wicked than he ever was." In the 1840s, Ada flirted with scandals: firstly, from a relaxed approach to extra-marital relationships with men, leading to rumours of affairs; and secondly, from her love of gambling. She apparently lost more than £3,000 on the horses during the later 1840s. The gambling led to her forming a syndicate with male friends, and an ambitious attempt in 1851 to create a mathematical model for successful large bets. This went disastrously wrong, leaving her thousands of pounds in debt to the syndicate, forcing her to admit it all to her husband. She had a shadowy relationship with Andrew Crosse's son John from 1844 onwards. John Crosse destroyed most of their correspondence after her death as part of a legal agreement. She bequeathed him the only heirlooms her father had personally left to her. During her final illness, she would panic at the idea of the younger Crosse being kept from visiting her.

Education
From 1832, when she was seventeen, her mathematical abilities began to emerge, and her interest in mathematics dominated the majority of her adult life. Her mother's obsession with rooting out any of the insanity of which she accused Byron was one of the reasons that Ada was taught mathematics from an early age. She was privately educated in mathematics and science by William Frend, William King, and Mary Somerville, the noted 19th-century researcher and scientific author. In the 1840s, the mathematician Augustus De Morgan extended her "much help in her mathematical studies" including study of advanced calculus topics including the "numbers of Bernoulli" (that formed her celebrated algorithm for Babbage's Analytical Engine). In a letter to Lady Byron, De Morgan suggested that Ada's skill in mathematics might lead her to become "an original mathematical investigator, perhaps of first-rate eminence".

Lovelace often questioned basic assumptions through integrating poetry and science. Whilst studying differential calculus, she wrote to De Morgan:

I may remark that the curious transformations many formulae can undergo, the unsuspected and to a beginner apparently impossible identity of forms exceedingly dissimilar at first sight, is I think one of the chief difficulties in the early part of mathematical studies. I am often reminded of certain sprites and fairies one reads of, who are at one's elbows in one shape now, and the next minute in a form most dissimilar.

Lovelace believed that intuition and imagination were critical to effectively applying mathematical and scientific concepts. She valued metaphysics as much as mathematics, viewing both as tools for exploring "the unseen worlds around us".

Death

Lovelace died at the age of 36 on 27 November 1852, from uterine cancer. The illness lasted several months, in which time Annabella took command over whom Ada saw, and excluded all of her friends and confidants. Under her mother's influence, Ada had a religious transformation and was coaxed into repenting of her previous conduct and making Annabella her executor. She lost contact with her husband after confessing something to him on 30 August which caused him to abandon her bedside. It is not known what she told him. She was buried, at her request, next to her father at the Church of St. Mary Magdalene in Hucknall, Nottinghamshire. A memorial plaque, written in Latin, to her and her father is in the chapel attached to Horsley Towers.

Work
Throughout her life, Lovelace was strongly interested in scientific developments and fads of the day, including phrenology and mesmerism. After her work with Babbage, Lovelace continued to work on other projects. In 1844, she commented to a friend Woronzow Greig about her desire to create a mathematical model for how the brain gives rise to thoughts and nerves to feelings ("a calculus of the nervous system"). She never achieved this, however. In part, her interest in the brain came from a long-running pre-occupation, inherited from her mother, about her "potential" madness. As part of her research into this project, she visited the electrical engineer Andrew Crosse in 1844 to learn how to carry out electrical experiments. In the same year, she wrote a review of a paper by Baron Karl von Reichenbach, Researches on Magnetism, but this was not published and does not appear to have progressed past the first draft. In 1851, the year before her cancer struck, she wrote to her mother mentioning "certain productions" she was working on regarding the relation of maths and music.

Lovelace first met Charles Babbage in June 1833, through their mutual friend Mary Somerville. Later that month, Babbage invited Lovelace to see the prototype for his difference engine. She became fascinated with the machine and used her relationship with Somerville to visit Babbage as often as she could. Babbage was impressed by Lovelace's intellect and analytic skills. He called her "The Enchantress of Number". In 1843, he wrote to her:

During a nine-month period in 1842–43, Lovelace translated the Italian mathematician Luigi Menabrea's article on Babbage's newest proposed machine, the Analytical Engine. With the article, she appended a set of notes. Explaining the Analytical Engine's function was a difficult task; many other scientists did not grasp the concept and the British establishment had shown little interest in it. Lovelace's notes even had to explain how the Analytical Engine differed from the original Difference Engine. Her work was well received at the time; the scientist Michael Faraday described himself as a supporter of her writing.

The notes are around three times longer than the article itself and include (in Note G), in complete detail, a method for calculating a sequence of Bernoulli numbers using the Analytical Engine, which might have run correctly had it ever been built (only Babbage's Difference Engine has been built, completed in London in 2002). Based on this work, Lovelace is now considered by many to be the first computer programmer and her method has been called the world's first computer program. Others dispute this because some of Charles Babbage's earlier writings could be considered computer programs.

Note G also contains Lovelace's dismissal of artificial intelligence. She wrote that "The Analytical Engine has no pretensions whatever to originate anything. It can do whatever we know how to order it to perform. It can follow analysis; but it has no power of anticipating any analytical relations or truths." This objection has been the subject of much debate and rebuttal, for example by Alan Turing in his paper "Computing Machinery and Intelligence". Most modern computer scientists argue that this view is outdated and that computer software can develop in ways that cannot necessarily be anticipated by programmers.

Lovelace and Babbage had a minor falling out when the papers were published, when he tried to leave his own statement (criticising the government's treatment of his Engine) as an unsigned preface, which could have been mistakenly interpreted as a joint declaration. When Taylor's Scientific Memoirs ruled that the statement should be signed, Babbage wrote to Lovelace asking her to withdraw the paper. This was the first that she knew he was leaving it unsigned, and she wrote back refusing to withdraw the paper. The historian Benjamin Woolley theorised that "His actions suggested he had so enthusiastically sought Ada's involvement, and so happily indulged her ... because of her 'celebrated name'." Their friendship recovered, and they continued to correspond. On 12 August 1851, when she was dying of cancer, Lovelace wrote to him asking him to be her executor, though this letter did not give him the necessary legal authority. Part of the terrace at Worthy Manor was known as Philosopher's Walk; it was there that Lovelace and Babbage were reputed to have walked while discussing mathematical principles.

First computer program

In 1840, Babbage was invited to give a seminar at the University of Turin about his Analytical Engine. Luigi Menabrea, a young Italian engineer and the future Prime Minister of Italy, transcribed Babbage's lecture into French, and this transcript was subsequently published in the Bibliothèque universelle de Genève in October 1842.
Babbage's friend Charles Wheatstone commissioned Ada Lovelace to translate Menabrea's paper into English. She then augmented the paper with notes, which were added to the translation. Ada Lovelace spent the better part of a year doing this, assisted with input from Babbage. These notes, which are more extensive than Menabrea's paper, were then published in the September 1843 edition of Taylor's Scientific Memoirs under the initialism AAL.

Ada Lovelace's notes were labelled alphabetically from A to G. In note G, she describes an algorithm for the Analytical Engine to compute Bernoulli numbers. It is considered to be the first published algorithm ever specifically tailored for implementation on a computer, and Ada Lovelace has often been cited as the first computer programmer for this reason. The engine was never completed and so her program was never tested.

In 1953, more than a century after her death, Ada Lovelace's notes on Babbage's Analytical Engine were republished as an appendix to B. V. Bowden's Faster than Thought: A Symposium on Digital Computing Machines. The engine has now been recognised as an early model for a computer and her notes as a description of a computer and software.

Insight into potential of computing devices
In her notes, Ada Lovelace emphasised the difference between the Analytical Engine and previous calculating machines, particularly its ability to be programmed to solve problems of any complexity. She realised the potential of the device extended far beyond mere number crunching. In her notes, she wrote:

This analysis was an important development from previous ideas about the capabilities of computing devices and anticipated the implications of modern computing one hundred years before they were realised. Walter Isaacson ascribes Ada's insight regarding the application of computing to any process based on logical symbols to an observation about textiles: "When she saw some mechanical looms that used punchcards to direct the weaving of beautiful patterns, it reminded her of how Babbage's engine used punched cards to make calculations." This insight is seen as significant by writers such as Betty Toole and Benjamin Woolley, as well as the programmer John Graham-Cumming, whose project Plan 28 has the aim of constructing the first complete Analytical Engine.

According to the historian of computing and Babbage specialist Doron Swade:

Ada saw something that Babbage in some sense failed to see. In Babbage's world his engines were bound by number...What Lovelace saw...was that number could represent entities other than quantity. So once you had a machine for manipulating numbers, if those numbers represented other things, letters, musical notes, then the machine could manipulate symbols of which number was one instance, according to rules. It is this fundamental transition from a machine which is a number cruncher to a machine for manipulating symbols according to rules that is the fundamental transition from calculation to computation—to general-purpose computation—and looking back from the present high ground of modern computing, if we are looking and sifting history for that transition, then that transition was made explicitly by Ada in that 1843 paper.

Distinction between mechanism and logical structure
Lovelace recognized the difference between the details of the computing mechanism, as covered in a 1834 article on the Difference Engine, 
and the logical structure of the Analytical Engine, on which the article she was reviewing dwelt. She noted that different specialists might be required in each area.

The [1834 article] chiefly treats it under its mechanical aspect, entering but slightly into the mathematical principles of which that engine is the representative, but giving, in considerable length, many details of the mechanism and contrivances by means of which it tabulates the various orders of differences. M. Menabrea, on the contrary, exclusively developes the analytical view; taking it for granted that mechanism is able to perform certain processes, but without attempting to explain how; and devoting his whole attention to explanations and illustrations of the manner in which analytical laws can be so arranged and combined as to bring every branch of that vast subject within the grasp of the assumed powers of mechanism. It is obvious that, in the invention of a calculating engine, these two branches of the subject are equally essential fields of investigation... They are indissolubly connected, though so different in their intrinsic nature, that perhaps the same mind might not be likely to prove equally profound or successful in both.

Controversy over contribution
Though Lovelace is often referred to as the first computer programmer, some biographers, computer scientists and historians of computing claim otherwise.

Allan G. Bromley, in the 1990 article Difference and Analytical Engines:

Bruce Collier, who later wrote a biography of Babbage, wrote in his 1970 Harvard University PhD thesis that Lovelace "made a considerable contribution to publicizing the Analytical Engine, but there is no evidence that she advanced the design or theory of it in any way".

Eugene Eric Kim and Betty Alexandra Toole consider it "incorrect" to regard Lovelace as the first computer programmer, as Babbage wrote the initial programs for his Analytical Engine, although the majority were never published. Bromley notes several dozen sample programs prepared by Babbage between 1837 and 1840, all substantially predating Lovelace's notes. Dorothy K. Stein regards Lovelace's notes as "more a reflection of the mathematical uncertainty of the author, the political purposes of the inventor, and, above all, of the social and cultural context in which it was written, than a blueprint for a scientific development".

Doron Swade, a specialist on history of computing known for his work on Babbage, discussed Lovelace during a lecture on Babbage's analytical engine. He explained that Ada was only a "promising beginner" instead of genius in mathematics, that she began studying basic concepts of mathematics five years after Babbage conceived the analytical engine so she could not have made important contributions to it, and that she only published the first computer program instead of actually writing it. But he agrees that Ada was the only person to see the potential of the analytical engine as a machine capable of expressing entities other than quantities.

In his book, Idea Makers, Stephen Wolfram defends Lovelace's contributions. While acknowledging that Babbage wrote several unpublished algorithms for the Analytical Engine prior to Lovelace's notes, Wolfram argues that "there's nothing as sophisticated—or as clean—as Ada's computation of the Bernoulli numbers. Babbage certainly helped and commented on Ada's work, but she was definitely the driver of it." Wolfram then suggests that Lovelace's main achievement was to distill from Babbage's correspondence "a clear exposition of the abstract operation of the machine—something which Babbage never did".

In popular culture

1810s
Lord Byron wrote the poem "Fare Thee Well" to his wife Lady Byron in 1816, following their separation after the birth of Ada Lovelace. In the poem he writes:

And when thou would'st solace gather—
When our child's first accents flow—
Wilt thou teach her to say "Father!"
Though his care she must forego?
When her little hands shall press thee—
When her lip to thine is pressed—
Think of him whose prayer shall bless thee—
Think of him thy love had blessed!
Should her lineaments resemble
Those thou never more may'st see,
Then thy heart will softly tremble
With a pulse yet true to me.

1970s
Lovelace is portrayed in Romulus Linney's 1977 play Childe Byron.

1990s
In the 1990 steampunk novel The Difference Engine by William Gibson and Bruce Sterling, Lovelace delivers a lecture on the "punched cards" programme which proves Gödel's incompleteness theorems decades before their actual discovery.

In the 1997 film Conceiving Ada, a computer scientist obsessed with Ada finds a way of communicating with her in the past by means of "undying information waves".

In Tom Stoppard's 1993 play Arcadia, the precocious teenage genius Thomasina Coverly—a character "apparently based" on Ada Lovelace (the play also involves Lord Byron)—comes to understand chaos theory, and theorises the second law of thermodynamics, before either is officially recognised.

2000s

Lovelace features in John Crowley's 2005 novel, Lord Byron's Novel: The Evening Land, as an unseen character whose personality is forcefully depicted in her annotations and anti-heroic efforts to archive her father's lost novel.

2010s

The 2015 play Ada and the Engine by Lauren Gunderson portrays Lovelace and Charles Babbage in unrequited love, and it imagines a post-death meeting between Lovelace and her father.

Lovelace and Babbage are the main characters in Sydney Padua's webcomic and graphic novel The Thrilling Adventures of Lovelace and Babbage. The comic features extensive footnotes on the history of Ada Lovelace, and many lines of dialogue are drawn from actual correspondence.

Lovelace and Mary Shelley as teenagers are the central characters in Jordan Stratford's steampunk series, The Wollstonecraft Detective Agency.

Lovelace, identified as Ada Augusta Byron, is portrayed by Lily Lesser in the second season of The Frankenstein Chronicles. She is employed as an "analyst" to provide the workings of a life-sized humanoid automaton. The brass workings of the machine are reminiscent of Babbage's analytical engine. Her employment is described as keeping her occupied until she returns to her studies in advanced mathematics.

Lovelace and Babbage appear as characters in the second season of the ITV series Victoria (2017). Emerald Fennell portrays Lovelace in the episode, "The Green-Eyed Monster."

The Cardano cryptocurrency platform, which was launched in 2017, uses Ada as the name for their cryptocurrency and Lovelace as the smallest sub-unit of an Ada.

"Lovelace" is the name given to the operating system designed by the character Cameron Howe in Halt and Catch Fire.

Lovelace is a primary character in the 2019 Big Finish Doctor Who audio play The Enchantress of Numbers, starring Tom Baker as the Fourth Doctor and Jane Slavin as his current companion, WPC Ann Kelso. Lovelace is played by Finty Williams.

In 2019, Lovelace is a featured character in the play STEM FEMMES by Philadelphia theater company Applied Mechanics.

2020s
Lovelace features as a character in "Spyfall, Part 2", the second episode of Doctor Who, series 12, which first aired on BBC One on 5 January 2020. The character was portrayed by Sylvie Briggs, alongside characterisations of Charles Babbage and Noor Inayat Khan. In 2021, Nvidia named its GPU architecture featured in the RTX 4000 Series, "Ada Lovelace", after her. It is also the first Nvidia architecture to feature both a first and last name.

Commemoration

The computer language Ada, created on behalf of the United States Department of Defense, was named after Lovelace. The reference manual for the language was approved on 10 December 1980 and the Department of Defense Military Standard for the language, MIL-STD-1815, was given the number of the year of her birth.

In 1981, the Association for Women in Computing inaugurated its Ada Lovelace Award. Since 1998, the British Computer Society (BCS) has awarded the Lovelace Medal, and in 2008 initiated an annual competition for women students. BCSWomen sponsors the Lovelace Colloquium, an annual conference for women undergraduates. Ada College is a further-education college in Tottenham Hale, London, focused on digital skills.

Ada Lovelace Day is an annual event celebrated on the second Tuesday of October, which began in 2009. Its goal is to "... raise the profile of women in science, technology, engineering, and maths," and to "create new role models for girls and women" in these fields. Events have included Wikipedia edit-a-thons with the aim of improving the representation of women on Wikipedia in terms of articles and editors to reduce unintended gender bias on Wikipedia.

The Ada Initiative was a non-profit organisation dedicated to increasing the involvement of women in the free culture and open source movements.

The Engineering in Computer Science and Telecommunications College building in Zaragoza University is called the Ada Byron Building. The computer centre in the village of Porlock, near where Lovelace lived, is named after her. Ada Lovelace House is a council-owned building in Kirkby-in-Ashfield, Nottinghamshire, near where Lovelace spent her infancy.

In 2012, a Google Doodle and blog post honoured her on her birthday. 

In 2013, Ada Developers Academy was founded and named after her. The mission of Ada Developers Academy is to diversify tech by providing women and gender diverse people the skills, experience, and community support to become professional software developers to change the face of tech.

On 17 September 2013, the BBC Radio 4 biography programme Great Lives devoted an episode to Ada Lovelace; she was sponsored by TV presenter Konnie Huq.

As of November 2015, all new British passports have included an illustration of Lovelace and Babbage.

In 2017, a Google Doodle honoured her with other women on International Women's Day.

On 2 February 2018, Satellogic, a high-resolution Earth observation imaging and analytics company, launched a ÑuSat type micro-satellite named in honour of Ada Lovelace.

In March 2018, The New York Times published a belated obituary for Ada Lovelace.

On 27 July 2018, Senator Ron Wyden submitted, in the United States Senate, the designation of 9 October 2018 as National Ada Lovelace Day: "To honor the life and contributions of Ada Lovelace as a leading woman in science and mathematics". The resolution (S.Res.592) was considered, and agreed to without amendment and with a preamble by unanimous consent.

In November 2020 it was announced that Trinity College Dublin whose library had previously held forty busts, all of them of men, was commissioning four new busts of women, one of whom was to be Lovelace.

In March 2022, a statue of Ada Lovelace was installed at the site of the former Ergon House in the City of Westminster, London, honoring its scientific history. The redevelopment was part of a complex with Imperial Chemical House. The statue was sculpted by Etienne and Mary Millner and based on the portrait by Margaret Sarah Carpenter.  The sculpture was unveiled on International Women's Day, 2022. It stands on the 7th floor of Millbank Quarter overlooking the junction of Dean Bradley Street and Horseferry Road.

In September 2022, Nvidia announced the Ada Lovelace graphics processing unit (GPU) microarchitecture.

Bicentenary
The bicentenary of Ada Lovelace's birth was celebrated with a number of events, including:

 The Ada Lovelace Bicentenary Lectures on Computability, Israel Institute for Advanced Studies, 20 December 2015 – 31 January 2016.
 Ada Lovelace Symposium, University of Oxford, 13–14 October 2015.
Ada.Ada.Ada, a one-woman show about the life and work of Ada Lovelace (using an LED dress), premiered at Edinburgh International Science Festival on 11 April 2015, and continues to touring internationally to promote diversity on STEM at technology conferences, businesses, government and educational organisations.

Special exhibitions were displayed by the Science Museum in London, England and the Weston Library (part of the Bodleian Library) in Oxford, England.

Publications
 Lovelace, Ada King. Ada, the Enchantress of Numbers: A Selection from the Letters of Lord Byron's Daughter and her Description of the First Computer. Mill Valley, CA: Strawberry Press, 1992. .

Publication history 
Six copies of the 1843 first edition of Sketch of the Analytical Engine with Ada Lovelace's "Notes" have been located. Three are held at Harvard University, one at the University of Oklahoma, and one at the United States Air Force Academy. On 20 July 2018, the sixth copy was sold at auction to an anonymous buyer for £95,000. A digital facsimile of one of the copies in the Harvard University Library is available online.

In December 2016, a letter written by Ada Lovelace was forfeited by Martin Shkreli to the New York State Department of Taxation and Finance for unpaid taxes owed by Shkreli.

See also

 Ai-Da (robot)
 Code: Debugging the Gender Gap
 List of pioneers in computer science
 Timeline of women in science
 Women in computing
 Women in STEM fields

Explanatory notes

References

General and cited sources

 .
 .
 .
 .
 .
 .
 
 
 .
  With notes upon the memoir by the translator.
 Miller, Clair Cain. "Ada Lovelace, 1815–1852," New York Times, 8 March 2018.
 .
 .
 .
 .
 .
 
 .
 .

Further reading
 Jennifer Chiaverini, 2017,  Enchantress of Numbers, Dutton, 426 pp.
 Christopher Hollings, Ursula Martin, and Adrian Rice, 2018, Ada Lovelace: The Making of a Computer Scientist, Bodleian Library, 114 pp.
 Miranda Seymour, 2018, In Byron's Wake: The Turbulent Lives of Byron's Wife and Daughter: Annabella Milbanke and Ada Lovelace, Pegasus, 547 pp.
 Jenny Uglow (22 November 2018), "Stepping Out of Byron's Shadow", The New York Review of Books, vol. LXV, no. 18, pp. 30–32.

External links

 "Ada's Army gets set to rewrite history at Inspirefest 2018" by Luke Maxwell, 4 August 2018
 
 "Untangling the Tale of Ada Lovelace" by Stephen Wolfram, December 2015
 
 
 
 
 
 
 
 
 
 
 
 

1815 births
1852 deaths
19th-century British women scientists
19th-century British writers
19th-century English mathematicians
19th-century English women writers
19th-century British inventors
19th-century English nobility
Ada (programming language)
British countesses
British women computer scientists
British women mathematicians
Burials in Nottinghamshire
Ada
Women computer scientists
Computer designers
Daughters of barons
Deaths from cancer in England
Deaths from uterine cancer
English computer programmers
English people of Scottish descent
English women poets
Godwin family
Lord Byron
Mathematicians from London
Women of the Victorian era
Burials at the Church of St Mary Magdalene, Hucknall